Kim Mo-se (born 30 November 1998) is a South Korean sports shooter. He competed in the men's 10 metre air pistol event at the 2020 Summer Olympics.

References

External links
 

1998 births
Living people
South Korean male sport shooters
Olympic shooters of South Korea
Shooters at the 2020 Summer Olympics
Place of birth missing (living people)